Jay Sankey is a Canadian close-up magician and a prolific creator of magic effects. He has been an active stage performer since the mid-1980s.

Work 
He is known as a stand-up comedian and authored a book about the art of stand-up, Zen and the Art of Stand-Up Comedy in 1999. However, he is best known for the many magical effects which he has published to help magicians develop their craft. His most well known works include his "Revolutionary Coin Magic" and "Revolutionary Card Magic" DVDs.

In 2009, Sankey announced that Andi Gladwin and Joshua Jay were in the process of writing his complete works in a trilogy of books.  In 2012 The Definitive Sankey volumes 1–3 were released in both a regular edition three book and a single DVD format and a deluxe version which has an extra DVD and is signed by Jay.

Sankey's website reflects his extraordinarily large contribution of magical effects to the magic industry with this statement: "Jay also holds the world's record for creating more original illusions than another other living magician."

Effects performed by other magicians 
David Copperfield performed Sankey's card in balloon effect.

Sankey developed effects for Criss Angel for less than a year before leaving the program. Sankey now produces humorous videos of himself in the persona of "Craigg Angelo."

Appearances 
Sankey is featured in Spellz, a TVO Kids program that he co-hosts with Bridget Hall, co-produced by David Peck.  He also performed in the second season of Penn & Teller: Fool Us (Episode 6, "Now THAT'S Bunny!", 10 August 2015).

Awards 
In 2007 Jay won 3rd place in Edd Withers' The Magic Woods Awards for Best Book: for the book Beyond Secrets.  He has authored numerous books on comedy and magic, and has produced/appeared in numerous instructional videos intended for magicians and other stage performers.

Private life 
Jay lives in Toronto with his wife Lisa, and his two children Mason and Madelaine.

See also
 List of magicians

References

Citations

Sources
 Sankey, Jay.  "Zen and the Art of the Monologue" (1999)

External links
 Jay Sankey's magic website
 Q&A with Jay Sankey 
 Jay Sankey biography

Canadian stand-up comedians
Canadian magicians
Living people
Year of birth missing (living people)
Canadian male comedians